The Koijärvi Movement was a Finnish environmental movement that started in the spring of 1979. Its objective was to prevent the draining of  near Forssa, an important bird habitat. The struggle lasted for two years and brought together previously fragmented, small circles of environmental activists to form a national movement. It was one of the most prominent of a wave of environmental actions in Finland at the time that led to the formation of the political party the Green League and the election of Greens to the Finnish parliament and hastened the establishment of a national environmental ministry.

References

Further reading
 
 

Environmentalism in Finland
Political history of Finland
Environmental movements